Princess Sophie Friederike Karoline Luise of Saxe-Coburg-Saalfeld (16 August 1778 – 9 July 1835) was a princess of Saxe-Coburg-Saalfeld, and the sister of Princess Victoria of Saxe-Coburg-Saalfeld and King Leopold I of Belgium, and aunt of Queen Victoria. By marriage, she was a Countess of Mensdorff-Pouilly.

She was born in Coburg, the eldest child of Francis, Duke of Saxe-Coburg-Saalfeld and Countess Augusta Reuss of Ebersdorf.

Early life

Sophie had a particularly close relationship with her sister Antoinette and both often attended the Schloss Fantaisie, a sanctuary of French emigrants. It was there where she met her future husband, Emmanuel von Mensdorff-Pouilly. They married on 23 February 1804 in Coburg. Her husband was elevated to count in 1818.

In 1806, her husband was in Saalfeld, a secondary residence of the Coburg court. Therefore, it was possible for him to have participated in the Battle of Saalfeld, he retrieved the remains of Prince Louis Ferdinand of Prussia from the battlefield and protected the residence of Sophie's father and family against the arrogance of the victorious French troops.

From 1824 to 1834 Sophie lived in Mainz, where her husband was a commander of the federal fortress; here she was generally referred to as "Princess". She was active as a writer and in 1830 published her romantic collection of fairy tales, Mährchen und Erzählungen. She received the Dame Grand Cross of the Order of Saint Catherine. 

Sophie died in Tuschimitz, Bohemia. She was buried in the park of Schloss Preitenstein, the family residence of the Mensdorff-Pouilly family.

Family
Emmanuel and Sophie had six sons:

 Hugo Ferdinand von Mensdorff-Pouilly (1806–1847)
 Alphons, Count von Mensdorff-Pouilly (1810–1894); married, firstly, in 1843, Countess Therese von Dietrichstein-Proskau-Leslie (1823–1856); married, secondly, in 1862, Countess Maria Theresia von Lamberg (1833–1876)
 Alfred Carl von Mensdorff-Pouilly (1812–1814)
 Alexander von Mensdorff-Pouilly (1813–1871), Fürst von Dietrichstein zu Nikolsburg 1868, was Austrian Foreign Minister and Prime Minister of Austria in the 1860s; married in 1857 Countess Alexandrine Maria von Dietrichstein-Proskau-Leslie (1824–1906)
 Leopold Emanuel von Mensdorff-Pouilly (1815–1832)
 Arthur August von Mensdorff-Pouilly (1817–1904); married, firstly, in 1853, Magdalene Kremzow (1835–1899), divorced in 1882; married, secondly, in 1902, Countess Bianca Albertina von Wickenburg (1837–1912)

Ancestry

References

1778 births
1835 deaths
Sophie
Mensdorff-Pouilly family
German countesses
People from Coburg
Collectors of fairy tales
Daughters of monarchs